Malayalam is a Dravidian language spoken in the Indian state of Kerala and the union territories of Lakshadweep and Puducherry (Mahé district) by the Malayali people. It is one of 22 scheduled languages of India. Malayalam was designated a "Classical Language of India" in 2013. Malayalam has official language status in Kerala and Puducherry (Mahé), and is also the primary spoken language of Lakshadweep, and is spoken by 34 million people in India. Malayalam is also spoken by linguistic minorities in the neighbouring states; with a significant number of speakers in the Kodagu and Dakshina Kannada districts of Karnataka, and Kanyakumari, district of Tamil Nadu. It is also spoken by the Malayali Diaspora worldwide, especially in the Persian Gulf countries, due to the large populations of Malayali expatriates there. They are a significant population in each city in India including Mumbai, Bengaluru, Delhi, Kolkata, Pune etc.

The origin of Malayalam remains a matter of dispute among scholars. The mainstream view holds that Malayalam descends from early Middle Tamil and separated from it sometime after the  CE. A second view argues for the development of the two languages out of "Proto-Dravidian" or "Proto-Tamil-Malayalam" in the prehistoric era, although this is generally rejected by historical linguists. It is generally agreed that the Quilon Syrian copper plates of 849/850 CE is the oldest available inscription written in Old Malayalam. The oldest literary work in Malayalam, distinct from the Tamil tradition, is dated from between the 9th and 11th centuries.

The earliest script used to write Malayalam was the Vatteluttu script. The current Malayalam script is based on the Vatteluttu script, which was extended with Grantha script letters to adopt Indo-Aryan loanwords. It bears high similarity with the Tigalari script, a historical script that was used to write the Tulu language in South Canara, and Sanskrit in the adjacent Malabar region. The modern Malayalam grammar is based on the book Kerala Panineeyam written by A. R. Raja Raja Varma in late 19th century CE. The first travelogue in any Indian language is the Malayalam Varthamanappusthakam, written by Paremmakkal Thoma Kathanar in 1785.

Robert Caldwell describes the extent of Malayalam in the 19th century as extending from the vicinity of Kumbla in the north where it supersedes with Tulu to Kanyakumari in the south, where it begins to be superseded by Tamil, besides the inhabited islands of Lakshadweep in the Arabian Sea.

Etymology
The term Malabar was used as an alternative term for Malayalam in foreign trade circles to denote the southwestern coast of the Indian peninsula, which also means The land of hills. The term originally referred to the western hilly land of the Chera dynasty (later Zamorins and the Kingdom of Cochin), Kingdom of Ezhimala (later Kolathunadu), and Ay kingdom (later Travancore), and only later became the name of its language.

The earliest extant literary works in the regional language of present-day Kerala probably date back to as early as the 12th century. At that time the language was differentiated by the name Kerala Bhasha. The distinctive 'Malayalam' named identity of this language appears to have come into existence only around the 16th century, when it was known as "Malayayma" or "Malayanma"; the words were also used to refer to the script and the region. According to Duarte Barbosa, a Portuguese visitor who visited Kerala in the early 16th century CE, the people in the southwestern Malabar coast of India from Kumbla in north to Kanyakumari in south had a unique language, which was called "Maliama" by them.

Prior to this period, the people of Kerala usually referred to their language as 'Tamil', and both terms overlapped into the colonial period.

History

Due to the geographical isolation of the Malabar Coast from the rest of the Indian peninsula due to the presence of the Western Ghats mountain ranges which lie parallel to the coast, the dialect of Old Tamil spoken in Kerala was different from that spoken in Tamil Nadu. The mainstream view holds that Malayalam began to grow as a distinct literary language from the western coastal dialect of Medieval Tamil (Karintamil) and the linguistic separation completed sometime between the 9th and 13th centuries. The renowned poets of Classical Tamil such as Paranar (1st century CE), Ilango Adigal (2nd–3rd century CE), and Kulasekhara Alvar (9th century CE) were Keralites. The Sangam works can be considered as the ancient predecessor of Malayalam.

Some scholars however believe that both Tamil and Malayalam developed during the prehistoric period from a common ancestor, 'Proto-Tamil-Malayalam', and that the notion of Malayalam being a 'daughter' of Tamil is misplaced. This is based on the fact that Malayalam and several Dravidian languages on the Western Coast have common archaic features which are not found even in the oldest historical forms of literary Tamil. Despite this Malayalam shares many common innovations with Tamil that emerged during the early Middle Tamil period, thus making independent descent impossible. 

For example, Old Tamil lacks the first and second person plural pronouns with the ending . It is in the Early Middle Tamil stage that  first appears:

Indeed, most features of Malayalam morphology are derivable from a form of speech corresponding to early Middle Tamil.

Robert Caldwell, in his 1856 book "A Comparative Grammar of the Dravidian or South-Indian Family of Languages", opined that literary Malayalam branched from Classical Tamil and over time gained a large amount of Sanskrit vocabulary and lost the personal terminations of verbs. As the language of scholarship and administration, Old-Tamil, which was written in Tamil-Brahmi and the Vatteluttu alphabet later, greatly influenced the early development of Malayalam as a literary language. The Malayalam script began to diverge from the Vatteluttu and the Western Grantha scripts in the 8th and 9th centuries of Common Era. And by the end of the 13th century a written form of the language emerged which was unique from the Vatteluttu script that was used to write Tamil on the eastern coast.

Old Malayalam 
Old Malayalam (Pazhaya Malayalam), an inscriptional language found in Kerala from c. 9th to c. 13th century CE, is the earliest attested form of Malayalam. The beginning of the development of Old Malayalam from a western coastal dialect of contemporary Tamil (Karintamil) can be dated to c. 7th - 8th century CE. It remained a west coast dialect until c. 9th century CE or a little later. The origin of Malayalam calendar dates back to year 825 CE. The formation of the language is mainly attributed to geographical separation of Kerala from the Tamil country and the influence of immigrant Tulu-Canarese Brahmins in Kerala (who also knew Sanskrit and Prakrit). It is generally agreed that the western coastal dialect of Tamil began to separate, diverge, and grow as a distinct language, mainly due to the heavy influence of Sanskrit and Prakrit, those became common prominent languages on Malabar Coast, when the caste system became strong in Kerala under Nambudiri Brahmins.

The Old Malayalam language was employed in several official records and transactions (at the level of the Chera Perumal kings as well as the upper-caste (Nambudiri) village temples). Most of the inscriptions in Old Malayalam were found from the northern districts of Kerala, those lie adjacent to Tulu Nadu. Old Malayalam was mostly written in Vatteluttu script (with Pallava/Southern Grantha characters). Old Malayalam had several features distinct from the contemporary Tamil, which include the nasalisation of adjoining sounds, substitution of palatal sounds for dental sounds, contraction of vowels, and the rejection of gender verbs. Ramacharitam and Thirunizhalmala are the possible literary works of Old Malayalam found so far.

Middle Malayalam 
Old Malayalam gradually developed into Middle Malayalam (Madhyakaala Malayalam) by 13th century CE. Malayalam literature also completely diverged from Tamil literature during this period. Works including Unniyachi Charitham, Unnichiruthevi Charitham, and Unniyadi Charitham, are written in Middle Malayalam, and date back to 13th and 14th centuries of Common Era. The Sandesha Kavyas of 14th century CE written in Manipravalam language include Unnuneeli Sandesam. Kannassa Ramayanam and Kannassa Bharatham by Rama Panikkar of the Niranam poets who lived between 1350 and 1450, are representative of this language. Ulloor has opined that Rama Panikkar holds the same position in Malayalam literature that Edmund Spenser does in English literature. The Champu Kavyas written by Punam Nambudiri, one among the Pathinettara Kavikal (Eighteen and a half poets) in the court of the Zamorin of Calicut, also belong to Middle Malayalam. The literary works of this period were heavily influenced by Manipravalam, which was a combination of contemporary Malayalam and Sanskrit. The word Mani-Pravalam literally means Diamond-Coral or Ruby-Coral. The 14th-century Lilatilakam text states Manipravalam to be a Bhashya (language) where "Malayalam and Sanskrit should combine together like ruby and coral, without the least trace of any discord". The scripts of Kolezhuthu and Malayanma were also used to write Middle Malayalam, in addition to Vatteluthu and Grantha script those were used to write Old Malayalam. The literary works written in Middle Malayalam were heavily influenced by Sanskrit and Prakrit, while comparing them with the modern Malayalam literature.

Modern Malayalam 
The Middle Malayalam was succeeded by Modern Malayalam (Aadhunika Malayalam) by 15th century CE. The poem Krishnagatha written by Cherusseri Namboothiri, who was the court poet of the king Udaya Varman Kolathiri (1446–1475) of Kolathunadu, is written in modern Malayalam. The language used in Krishnagatha is the modern spoken form of Malayalam. During the 16th century CE, Thunchaththu Ezhuthachan from the Kingdom of Tanur and Poonthanam Nambudiri from the Kingdom of Valluvanad followed the new trend initiated by Cherussery in their poems. The Adhyathmaramayanam Kilippattu and Mahabharatham Kilippattu written by Ezhuthachan and Jnanappana written by Poonthanam are also included in the earliest form of Modern Malayalam. 

It is Thunchaththu Ezhuthachan who is also credited with the development of Malayalam script into the current form through the intermixing and modification of the erstwhile scripts of Vatteluttu, Kolezhuthu, and Grantha script, which were used to write the inscriptions and literary works of Old and Middle Malayalam. He further eliminated excess and unnecessary letters from the modified script. Hence, Ezhuthachan is also known as The Father of modern Malayalam. The development of modern Malayalam script was also heavily influenced by the Tigalari script, which was used to write Sanskrit, due to the influence of Tuluva Brahmins in Kerala. The language used in the Arabi Malayalam works of 16th–17th century CE is a mixture of Modern Malayalam and Arabic. They follow the syntax of modern Malayalam, though written in a modified form of Arabic script, which is known as Arabi Malayalam script. P. Shangunny Menon ascribes the authorship of the medieval work Keralolpathi, which describes the Parashurama legend and the departure of the final Cheraman Perumal king to Mecca, to Thunchaththu Ramanujan Ezhuthachan.

Kunchan Nambiar introduced a new literary form called Thullal, and Unnayi Variyar introduced reforms in Attakkatha literature. The printing, prose literature, and Malayalam journalism, developed after the latter-half of 18th century CE. Modern literary movements in Malayalam literature began in the late 19th century with the rise of the famous Modern Triumvirate consisting of Kumaran Asan, Ulloor S. Parameswara Iyer and Vallathol Narayana Menon. In the second half of the 20th century, Jnanpith winning poets and writers like G. Sankara Kurup, S. K. Pottekkatt, Thakazhi Sivasankara Pillai, M. T. Vasudevan Nair, O. N. V. Kurup, and Akkitham Achuthan Namboothiri, had made valuable contributions to the modern Malayalam literature. The life and works of Edasseri Govindan Nair have assumed greater socio-literary significance after his death and Edasseri is now recognised as an important poet of Malayalam. Later, writers like O. V. Vijayan, Kamaladas, M. Mukundan, Arundhati Roy, Vaikom Muhammed Basheer, have gained international recognition. Malayalam has also borrowed a lot of its words from various foreign languages, mainly from the Semitic languages including Arabic, and the European languages including Dutch and Portuguese, due to the long heritage of Indian Ocean trade and the Portuguese-Dutch colonisation of the Malabar Coast.

Dialects
Variations in intonation patterns, vocabulary, and distribution of grammatical and phonological elements are observable along the parameters of region, religion, community, occupation, social stratum, style and register.

According to the Dravidian Encyclopedia, the regional dialects of Malayalam can be divided into fifteen dialect areas. They are as follows:

 Kasaragod
 North Malabar
 Wayanad
 Kozhikode
 Eranad
 Valluvanad (South Malabar)
 Palakkad
 Thrissur-Kochi
 North Travancore
 West Vembanad
 Central Travancore
 South Travancore
 Lakshadweep
 Beary
 Ravula

According to Ethnologue, the dialects are: Malabar, Nagari-Malayalam, North Kerala, Central Kerala, South Kerala, Kayavar, Namboodiri, Nair, Mappila, Beary, Jeseri, Yerava, Pulaya, Nasrani, and Kasargod. The community dialects are: Namboodiri, Nair, Arabi Malayalam, Pulaya, and Nasrani. Whereas both the Namboothiri and Nair dialects have a common nature, the Arabi Malayalam is among the most divergent of dialects, differing considerably from literary Malayalam. Jeseri is a dialect of Malayalam spoken mainly in the Union territory of Lakshadweep and Beary is spoken in Tulu Nadu which are nearer to Kerala. Of the total 33,066,392 Malayalam speakers in India in 2001, 33,015,420 spoke the standard dialects, 19,643 spoke the Yerava dialect and 31,329 spoke non-standard regional variations like Eranadan.

The dialects of Malayalam spoken in the districts like Kasaragod, Kannur, Wayanad, Kozhikode, and Malappuram in the former Malabar District have few influences from Kannada. For example, the words those start with the sound "V" in Malayalam become "B" in these districts as in Kannada. Also the Voiced retroflex approximant (/ɻ/) which is seen in both Tamil and the standard form of Malayalam, are not seen in the northern dialects of Malayalam, as in Kannada. For example, the words Vazhi (Path), Vili (Call), Vere (Another), and Vaa (Come/Mouth), become Bayi, Bili, Bere, and Baa in the northern dialects of Malayalam. Similarly the Malayalam spoken in the southern districts of Kerala, i.e., Thiruvananthapuram-Kollam-Pathanamthitta area is influenced by Tamil.

Labels such as "Nampoothiri Dialect", "Mappila Dialect", and "Nasrani Dialect" refer to overall patterns constituted by the sub-dialects spoken by the subcastes or sub-groups of each such caste. The most outstanding features of the major communal dialects of Malayalam are summarized below:
 The Muslim dialect, also known as Arabi Malayalam, shows maximum divergence from the literary Standard Dialect of Malayalam. It is very much influenced by Arabic and Persian rather than by Sanskrit or by English. The retroflex continuant  of the literary dialect is realised in the Muslim dialect as the palatal .
 The Syrian Christian or Nasrani dialect of Malayalam is quite close to the Nair dialect, especially in phonology. The speech of the educated section among Syrian Christians and that of those who are close to the church are peculiar in having a number of assimilated as well as unassimilated loan words from English and Syriac. The few loan words which have found their way into the Christian dialect are assimilated in many cases through the process of de-aspiration.
 The Ravula is a tribal dialect of Malayalam spoken by the members of Ravula tribe who are primarily inhabitants of the Kodagu district of Karnataka.
 Tamil spoken in the Kanyakumari district has influences from Malayalam language.

External influences and loanwords 
Malayalam has incorporated many elements from other languages over the years, the most notable of these being Sanskrit and later, English. According to Sooranad Kunjan Pillai who compiled the authoritative Malayalam lexicon, the other principal languages whose vocabulary was incorporated over the ages were Arabic, Dutch, Hindustani, Pali, Persian, Portuguese, Prakrit, and Syriac.

 Many medieval liturgical texts were written in an admixture of Sanskrit and early Malayalam, called Manipravalam. The influence of Sanskrit was very prominent in formal Malayalam used in the medieval literature. Malayalam has a substantially high number of Sanskrit loanwords but these are seldom used. 
 Some Arabic loanwords like adālattŭ (court of justice), jāmyaṃ (bail), japti (foreclosure), jilla (district), tālukkŭ (subdistrict), etc., are used in the formal literary Malayalam for administrative purposes. 
 Loanwords and influences also from Hebrew, Syriac, and Ladino abound in the Jewish Malayalam dialects, as well as English, Portuguese, Syriac, and Greek in the Christian dialects, while Arabic and Persian elements predominate in the Muslim dialects. 
 The Muslim dialect known as Mappila Malayalam is predominantly in the northern districts of Kerala. Another Muslim dialect called Beary bashe is used in the extreme northern part of Kerala along with the southern part of Karnataka in a former region called Tulu Nadu.

Geographic distribution and population

Malayalam is a language spoken by the native people of southwestern India and the islands of Lakshadweep in Arabian Sea. According to the Indian census of 2011, there were 32,413,213 speakers of Malayalam in Kerala, making up 93.2% of the total number of Malayalam speakers in India, and 97.03% of the total population of the state. There were a further 701,673 (1.14% of the total number) in Karnataka, 957,705 (2.70%) in Tamil Nadu, and 406,358 (1.2%) in Maharashtra.

The number of Malayalam speakers in Lakshadweep is 51,100, which is only 0.15% of the total number, but is as much as about 84% of the population of Lakshadweep. Malayalam was the most spoken language in erstwhile Gudalur taluk (now Gudalur and Panthalur taluks) of Nilgiris district in Tamil Nadu which accounts for 48.8% population and it was the second most spoken language in Mangalore and Puttur taluks of South Canara accounting for 21.2% and 15.4% respectively according to 1951 census report. 25.57% of the total population in the Kodagu district of Karnataka are Malayalis, and they form single largest linguistic group accounting for 35.5% in the Virajpet Taluk. Around one-third of the Malayalis in Kodagu district speak the Yerava dialect according to the 2011 census, which is native to Kodagu and Wayanad.

In all, Malayalis made up 3.22% of the total Indian population in 2011. Of the total 34,713,130 Malayalam speakers in India in 2011, 33,015,420 spoke the standard dialects, 19,643 spoke the Yerava dialect and 31,329 spoke non-standard regional variations like Eranadan. As per the 1991 census data, 28.85% of all Malayalam speakers in India spoke a second language and 19.64% of the total knew three or more languages.

Just before independence, Malaya attracted many Malayalis. Large numbers of Malayalis have settled in Chennai, Bengaluru, Mangaluru, Hyderabad, Mumbai, Navi Mumbai, Pune, Mysuru and Delhi. Many Malayalis have also emigrated to the Middle East, the United States, and Europe. There were 179,860 speakers of Malayalam in the United States, according to the 2000 census, with the highest concentrations in Bergen County, New Jersey, and Rockland County, New York. There are 144,000 of Malayalam speakers in Malaysia. There were 11,687 Malayalam speakers in Australia in 2016. The 2001 Canadian census reported 7,070 people who listed Malayalam as their mother tongue, mainly in Toronto. The 2006 New Zealand census reported 2,139 speakers. 134 Malayalam speaking households were reported in 1956 in Fiji. There is also a considerable Malayali population in the Persian Gulf regions, especially in Dubai and Doha.

Phonology

For the consonants and vowels, the International Phonetic Alphabet (IPA) symbol is given, followed by the Malayalam character and the ISO 15919 transliteration. The current Malayalam script bears high similarity with Tigalari script, which was used for writing the Tulu language, spoken in coastal Karnataka (Dakshina Kannada and Udupi districts) and the northernmost Kasargod district of Kerala. Tigalari script was also used for writing Sanskrit in Malabar region.

Vowels

 ്* formed from word final short /u/s but now there are /u/s finally as well, mostly in loanwords like in guru but native pērŭ; It is also added to the end of loanwords ending in some consonants, e.g. Skt. manas, suhr̥t, Ml. manassŭ, suhr̥ttŭ, En. current Ml. karaṇḍŭ. Therefore, it has no independent vowel letter (because it never occurs at the beginning of words) but, when it comes after a consonant, there are various ways of representing it. In medieval times, it was just represented with the symbol for  ⟨⟩, but later on it was just completely omitted (that is, written as an inherent vowel ⟨⟩, thus, pērŭ was once written as pēra). According to one author, this alternative form ⟨⟩ is historically more correct, though the simplified form without a vowel sign u is common nowadays.
 * is represented as basic or the "default" vowel in the Abugida script.

Except for the first, the other three have been omitted from the current script used in Kerala as there are no words in current Malayalam that use them.

Some authors say that Malayalam has no diphthongs and /ai̯, au̯/ are clusters of V+glide j/ʋ while others consider all V+glide clusters to be diphthongs /ai̯, aːi̯, au̯, ei̯, oi̯, i̯a/ as in kai, vāypa, auṣadhaṁ, cey, koy and kāryaṁ

Vowel length is phonemic and all of the vowels have minimal pairs for example paṭṭŭ "silk", pāṭṭŭ "song", koḍi "flag", kōḍi "crore" (10 million), er̠i "throw", ēr̠i "lots"

Some speakers also have /æː/, /ɔː/, /ə/ from English loanwords e.g. /bæːŋgɨ̆/ "bank" but most speakers switch it with /aː/, /eː/ or /ja/; /oː/ or /aː/ and /e/ or /a/. (See Manglish (Malayalam))

Consonants

 As in other Dravidian languages, the retroflex series are true subapical consonants, in which the underside of the tongue contacts the roof.
 All of the alveolars except /s/ are apical.
 /, / can either be postalveolar or alveolo-palatal depending upon the speaker and dialect; the postalveolar and alveolo-palatal realizations are in free variation.
 The alveolar nasal once had a separate character ⟨ഩ⟩ that is now obsolete and the sound is now almost always represented by the symbol that was originally used only for the dental nasal.
The proto Dravidian alveolar stop *ṯ developed into an alveolar trill /r/ in many of the Dravidian languages while *ṯṯ and *ṉṯ remained in Malayalam.
 ന്റ is pronounced only as n̠d̠ but ൻറ can be pronounced as n̠d̠ or n̠r̠, n̠r̠ doesn't occur natively but it occurs in loans like എൻറോൾ (en̠r̠ōḷ) 'enroll' or ഹെൻറി (hen̠r̠i) 'Henry'.
 All non geminated voiceless stops and affricate become voiced in intervocalic position like in Tamil but unlike Tamil it doesn't spirantize, it remains a stop; e.g. makaṉ Ml. [mɐgɐn] Ta. [mɐɣɐn]; it also gets voiced after a nasal.
 The geminated velars /k:/ and /ŋ:/ are sometimes palatalized word medially after /j, i(:), e(:)/  like in the words  [kiɖɐk:ugɐ] vs  [iɾikʲ:ugɐ] and  [mɐŋ:ɐl] vs.  [mɐt̪:ɐŋʲ:ɐ], their distribution is unpredictable e.g. it doesn't palatalize in vikkŭ but does in irikkŭ. If the palatalization is from /j/ it is sometimes deleted e.g. poykko can be [pojkʲːo] or [pokʲːo], aḍaykka as [ɐɖɐjkʲːɐ] or [ɐɖɐkʲːɐ]. Some of the northern dialects might pronounce them without palatalization.
Though nowadays most people (especially youngsters) pronounce  as  like in the word  . In the Jesari dialect the native /p/ too spirantized to [f].
  are unreleased word finally. Words will never begin or end with a geminated consonant.  never occur word initially. All consonants appear word medially.
 The retroflex lateral is clearly retroflex, but may be more of a flap  (= ) than an approximant . The approximant  has both rhotic and lateral qualities, and is indeterminate between an approximant and a fricative, but is laminal post-alveolar rather than a true retroflex. The articulation changes part-way through, perhaps explaining why it behaves as both a rhotic and a lateral, both an approximant and a fricative, but the nature of the change is not understood.
  are very weakly palatalized while  are clear.
 Around 75% of nk and 50% of ñc and nt from Old Malayalam got assimilated to ṅṅ, ññ and nn, almost all of the n̠t̠ merged with nn suggesting an earlier merger of some of the n̠t̠ and nt (for e.g. the cognate of Ta. nan̠r̠i is spelt as nandi and pronounced nanni); mp and ṇṭ were unchanged, e.g. Ta. mūṉṟu, maruntu, kañci, teṅku, Ml. mūnnŭ, marunnŭ, kaññi, teṅṅŭ. Word final ai, āy and ey became  the word is monosyllabic, e.g. Ta. avai, māṅgāy, veṇṇey Ml. ava, māṅṅa, veṇṇa. Final āy in monosyllabic words became āya e.g. Ta. kāy, Ml. kāya.
 Loanwords with /z/ are switched with /s/ but not /d͡ʒ/ like in Hindi or Telugu e.g. /brasi:l/ En. "Brazil" unless it was loaned through Hindi then the Hindi pronunciation is taken e.g. /d͡ʒilːa/ Hi. Per. , other Perso-Arabic phonemes like  are switched with /k, kʰ, g, h, C, ∅, ∅/, sometimes /q, x/ are switched with /kʰ, k/ e.g. قطر (Qaṭar) as ഖത്തർ (khattaṟ) and Arb. خَطّ‎ (xaṭṭ) as കത്ത് (kattŭ). "taxi" as ṯāksi or more commonly ṭāksi. The English /ɹ/ is loaned as either /ɾ/ or /r/ unpredictably, for e.g. 'current' got loaned as karaṇḍŭ but 'maroon' got loaned as 'mar̠ūṇ' or 'mer̠ūṇ' but the cluster /ɹs/ is loaned as /ɻs/ other clusters are loaned as /rC/ or /ɾC/, /ɻ/ only occurs in words with /ɹs/ e.g. 'force' as fōḻsŭ. Speakers with non rhotic English accents don't have /ɹC/ clusters in English loans and pronounce it as fōs(ŭ). In Sanskrit loans with /t̪C/ and /d̪C/ (unless C is a sonorant or a dental stop) sometimes the /t̪, d̪/ becomes /l/ especially in /t̪s/ e.g. utsava > ulsavam, utpādana > ulpādaṉam, udghāṭana > ulghāḍaṉam. There are some native words with /s/ (urasŭ) and /ʃ/ (vīśŭ) but rest of the fricatives (except /f/ in native words of Jesari) and aspirates are only found in loans.
 Rarely some speakers pronounce the voiced aspirated consonants as voiceless so words like dhaṉam as thaṉam, it is more commonly deaspirated so dhaṉam as daṉam and kharam as karam, intervocalically the voiceless aspirate also becomes voiced so mukham as mugam.

Sample text
The following text is Article 1 of the Universal Declaration of Human Rights.

English
All human beings are born free and equal in dignity and rights. They are endowed with reason and conscience and should act towards one another in a spirit of brotherhood.

Malayalam
മനുഷ്യരെല്ലാവരും തുല്യാവകാശങ്ങളോടും അന്തസ്സോടും സ്വാതന്ത്ര്യത്തോടുംകൂടി ജനിച്ചിട്ടുള്ളവരാണ്‌. അന്യോന്യം ഭ്രാതൃഭാവത്തോടെ പെരുമാറുവാനാണ്‌ മനുഷ്യന് വിവേകബുദ്ധിയും മനസാക്ഷിയും സിദ്ധമായിരിക്കുന്നത്‌.

Romanisation (ISO 15919)
man̠uṣyarellāvaruṁ tulyāvakāśaṅṅaḷōṭuṁ antassōṭuṁ svātantryattōṭuṅkūṭi jan̠icciṭṭuḷḷavarāṇ‌ŭ. an̠yōn̠yaṁ bhrātr̥bhāvattōṭe perumāṟuvān̠āṇ‌ŭ man̠uṣyan̠ŭ vivēkabuddhiyuṁ man̠asākṣiyuṁ siddhamāyirikkunnat‌ŭ.

IPA
/manuʂjaɾelːaːʋaɾum t̪uljaːʋaɡaːʃaŋːaɭoːɖum an̪d̪asːoːɖum swaːd̪an̪d̪ɾjat̪ːoːɖuŋguːɖi d͡ʒanit͡ʃːiʈːuɭːaʋaɾaːɳɨ̆ ǁ anjoːnjam bʱraːt̪rɨ̆bʱaːʋat̪t̪oːɖe peɾumaːruʋaːnaːɳɨ̆ manuʂjanɨ̆ ʋiʋeːkabud̪ːʱijum manasaːkʂijum sid̪ːʱamaːjiɾikːun̪ːad̪ɨ̆ ǁ/

Grammar

Malayalam has a canonical word order of SOV (subject–object–verb), as do other Dravidian languages. A rare OSV word order occurs in interrogative clauses when the interrogative word is the subject. Both adjectives and possessive adjectives precede the nouns they modify. Malayalam has 6 or 7 grammatical cases. Verbs are conjugated for tense, mood and aspect, but not for person, gender nor number except in archaic or poetic language. The modern Malayalam grammar is based on the book Kerala Panineeyam written by A. R. Raja Raja Varma in late 19th century CE.

Nouns
The declensional paradigms for some common nouns and pronouns are given below. As Malayalam is an agglutinative language, it is difficult to delineate the cases strictly and determine how many there are, although seven or eight is the generally accepted number. Alveolar plosives and nasals (although the modern Malayalam script does not distinguish the latter from the dental nasal) are underlined for clarity, following the convention of the National Library at Kolkata romanization.

Personal pronouns
Vocative forms are given in parentheses after the nominative, as the only pronominal vocatives that are used are the third person ones, which only occur in compounds.

Other nouns
The following are examples of some of the most common declension patterns.

Words adopted from Sanskrit
When words are adopted from Sanskrit, their endings are usually changed to conform to Malayalam norms:

Nouns
 Masculine Sanskrit nouns with a word stem ending in a short /a/ take the ending /an/ in the nominative singular. For example, Kr̥ṣṇa → Kr̥ṣṇan. The final /n/ is dropped before masculine surnames, honorifics, or titles ending in /an/ and beginning with a consonant other than /n/ – e.g., "Krishna Menon", "Krishna Kaniyaan" etc., but "Krishnan Ezhutthachan". Surnames ending with /ar/ or /aḷ/ (where these are plural forms of "an" denoting respect) are treated similarly – "Krishna Pothuval", "Krishna Chakyar", but "Krishnan Nair", "Krishnan Nambiar", as are Sanskrit surnames such "Varma(n)", "Sharma(n)", or "Gupta(n)" (rare) – e.g., "Krishna Varma", "Krishna Sharman". If a name is a compound, only the last element undergoes this transformation – e.g., "Kr̥ṣṇa" + "dēva" = "Kr̥ṣṇadēvan", not "Kr̥ṣṇandēvan".
 Feminine words ending in a long /ā/ or /ī/ are changed to end in a short /a/ or /i/, for example "Sītā" → "Sīta" and "Lakṣmī" → "Lakṣmi". However, the long vowel still appears in compound words, such as "Sītādēvi" or" Lakṣmīdēvi". The long ī is generally reserved for the vocative forms of these names, although in Sanskrit the vocative actually takes a short /i/. There are also a small number of nominative /ī/ endings that have not been shortened – a prominent example being the word "strī" for "woman".
 Nouns that have a stem in /-an/ and which end with a long /ā/ in the masculine nominative singular have /vŭ/ added to them, for example "Brahmā" (stem "Brahman") → "Brahmāvŭ". When the same nouns are declined in the neuter and take a short /a/ ending in Sanskrit, Malayalam adds an additional /m/, e.g. "Brahma" (neuter nominative singular of "Brahman") becomes "Brahmam". This is again omitted when forming compounds.
 Words whose roots end in /-an/ but whose nominative singular ending is /-a-/ (for example, the Sanskrit root of "karma" is actually "karman") are also changed. The original root is ignored and "karma" (the form in Malayalam being "karmam" because it ends in a short /a/) is taken as the basic form of the noun when declining. However, this does not apply to all consonant stems, as "unchangeable" stems such as "manas" ("mind") and "suhr̥t" ("friend") are identical to the Malayalam nominative singular forms (although the regularly derived "manam" sometimes occurs as an alternative to "manas").
 Sanskrit words describing things or animals rather than people with a stem in short /a/ end with an /m/ in Malayalam. For example,"Rāmāyaṇa" → "Rāmāyaṇam". In most cases, this is actually the same as the Sanskrit accusative case ending, which is also /m/ (or, allophonically, anusvara due to the requirements of the sandhi word-combining rules) in the neuter nominative. However, "things and animals" and "people" are not always differentiated based on whether or not they are sentient beings; for example, "Narasimha" becomes "Narasiṃham" and not "Narasiṃhan", whereas "Ananta" becomes "Anantan" even though both are sentient. This does not strictly correspond to the Sanskrit neuter gender, as both "Narasiṃha" and "Ananta" are masculine nouns in the original Sanskrit.
 Nouns with short vowel stems other than /a/, such as "Viṣṇu", "Prajāpati" etc. are declined with the Sanskrit stem acting as the Malayalam nominative singular (the Sanskrit nominative singular is formed by adding a visarga, e.g., as in "Viṣṇuḥ")
 The original Sanskrit vocative is often used in formal or poetic Malayalam, e.g. "Harē" (for "Hari") or "Prabhō" (for "Prabhu" – "Lord"). This is restricted to certain contexts – mainly when addressing deities or other exalted individuals, so a normal man named Hari would usually be addressed using a Malayalam vocative such as "Harī". The Sanskrit genitive is also occasionally found in Malayalam poetry, especially the personal pronouns "mama" ("my" or "mine") and "tava" ("thy" or "thine"). Other cases are less common and generally restricted to the realm of Maṇipravāḷam.
 Along with these tatsama borrowings, there are also many tadbhava words in common use. These were incorporated via borrowing before the separation of Malayalam and Tamil. As the language did not then accommodate Sanskrit phonology as it now does, words were changed to conform to the Old Tamil phonological system, for example "Kr̥ṣṇa" → "Kaṇṇan". Most of his works are oriented on the basic Malayalam family and cultures and many of them were path-breaking in the history of Malayalam literature

Writing system

Aside from the Malayalam script, the Malayalam language has been written in other scripts like Latin, Syriac and Arabic. Suriyani Malayalam was used by Saint Thomas Christians (also known as Nasranis) until the 19th century. Arabic scripts particularly were taught in madrasahs in Kerala and the Lakshadweep Islands.

Malayalam script

Historically, several scripts were used to write Malayalam. Among these were the Vatteluttu, Kolezhuthu and Malayanma scripts. But it was the Grantha script, another Southern Brahmi variation, which gave rise to the modern Malayalam script. The modern Malayalam script bears high similarity to Tigalari script, which was used for writing Tulu language in Coastal Karnataka (Dakshina Kannada and Udupi districts) and the northernmost Kasaragod district of Kerala. It is syllabic in the sense that the sequence of graphic elements means that syllables have to be read as units, though in this system the elements representing individual vowels and consonants are for the most part readily identifiable. In the 1960s Malayalam dispensed with many special letters representing less frequent conjunct consonants and combinations of the vowel /u, u:/ with different consonants.

Malayalam script consists of a total of 578 characters. The script contains 52 letters including 16 vowels and 36 consonants, which forms 576 syllabic characters, and contains two additional diacritic characters named anusvāra and visarga. The earlier style of writing has been superseded by a new style as of 1981. This new script reduces the different letters for typesetting from 900 to fewer than 90. This was mainly done to include Malayalam in the keyboards of typewriters and computers.

In 1999 a group named "Rachana Akshara Vedi" produced a set of free fonts containing the entire character repertoire of more than 900 glyphs. This was announced and released along with a text editor in the same year at Thiruvananthapuram, the capital of Kerala. In 2004, the fonts were released under the GNU GPL license by Richard Stallman of the Free Software Foundation at the Cochin University of Science and Technology in Kochi, Kerala.

Chillu letters 
A chillu, or a chillaksharam, is a special consonant letter that represents a pure consonant independently, without help of a virama. Unlike a consonant represented by an ordinary consonant letter, this consonant is never followed by an inherent vowel. Anusvara and visarga fit this definition but are not usually included. ISCII and Unicode 5.0 treat a chillu as a glyph variant of a normal ("base") consonant letter. In Unicode 5.1 and later, chillu letters are treated as independent characters, encoded atomically.

Number system and other symbols

Numerals 

Malayalam numbers and fractions are written as follows. These are archaic and no longer used. Instead, the common Hindu-Arabic numeral system is followed. Note that there is a confusion about the glyph of Malayalam digit zero.

Number "11" is written as "൰൧" and not "൧൧". "32" is written as "൩൰൨" similar to the Tamil numeral system.

It is split into:

  : 2 – 
  : 1000 – 
  : 10 – 
  : 3 – 

Combine them together to get the Malayalam number .

And 1,00,000 as "" = hundred(), thousand() (100×1000), 10,00,000 as "" = ten(), hundred(), thousand() (10×100×1000) and 1,00,00,000 as "" = hundred(), hundred(), thousand() (100×100×1000).

Later on this system got reformed to be more similar to the Hindu-Arabic numerals so 10,00,000 in the reformed numerals it would be .

Fractions 
In Malayalam you can transcribe any fraction by affixing after the denominator followed by the numerator, so a fraction like  would be read as  'out of ten, seven' but fractions like   and  have distinct names and  'half quarter'.

Vattezhuthu alphabet

Vatteluttu ("round writing") is a script that had evolved from Tamil-Brahmi and was once used extensively in the southern part of present-day Tamil Nadu and in Kerala.

Malayalam was first written in Vattezhuthu. The Vazhappally inscription issued by Rajashekhara Varman is the earliest example, dating from about 830 CE. During the medieval period, the Tigalari script that was used for writing Tulu in South Canara, and Sanskrit in the adjacent Malabar region, had a close similarity to the modern Malayalam script. In the Tamil country, the modern Tamil script had supplanted Vattezhuthu by the 15th century, but in the Malabar region, Vattezhuthu remained in general use up to the 17th century, or the 18th century. A variant form of this script, Kolezhuthu, was used until about the 19th century mainly in the Malabar-Cochin area.

Vatteluttu was in general use, but was not suitable for literature where many Sanskrit words were used. Like Tamil-Brahmi, it was originally used to write Tamil, and as such, did not have letters for voiced or aspirated consonants used in Sanskrit but not used in Tamil. For this reason, Vatteluttu and the Grantha alphabet were sometimes mixed, as in the Manipravalam. One of the oldest examples of the Manipravalam literature, Vaishikatantram (Vaiśikatantram), dates back to the 12th century, where the earliest form of the Malayalam script was used, which seems to have been systematized to some extent by the first half of the 13th century.

Another variant form, Malayanma, was used in the south of Thiruvananthapuram. By the 19th century, old scripts like Kolezhuthu had been supplanted by Arya-eluttu – that is the current Malayalam script. Nowadays, it is widely used in the press of the Malayali population in Kerala.

Grantha

According to Arthur Coke Burnell, one form of the Grantha alphabet, originally used in the Chola dynasty, was imported into the southwest coast of India in the 8th or 9th century, which was then modified in course of time in this secluded area, where communication with the east coast was very limited. It later evolved into Tigalari-Malayalam script was used by the Malayali, Havyaka Brahmins and Tulu Brahmin people, but was originally only applied to write Sanskrit. This script split into two scripts: Tigalari and Malayalam. While Malayalam script was extended and modified to write vernacular language Malayalam, the Tigalari was written for Sanskrit only. In Malabar, this writing system was termed Arya-eluttu (Ārya eḻuttŭ), meaning "Arya writing" (Sanskrit is Indo-Aryan language while Malayalam is a Dravidian language).

Karshoni

Suriyani Malayalam (സുറിയാനി മലയാളം, ܣܘܪܝܢܝ ܡܠܝܠܡ), also known as Karshoni, Syro-Malabarica or Syriac Malayalam, is a version of Malayalam written in a variant form of the Syriac alphabet which was popular among the Saint Thomas Christians (also known as Syrian Christians or Nasranis) of Kerala in India. It uses Malayalam grammar, the Maḏnḥāyā or "Eastern" Syriac script with special orthographic features, and vocabulary from Malayalam and East Syriac. This originated in the South Indian region of the Malabar Coast (modern-day Kerala). Until the 20th century, the script was widely used by Syrian Christians in Kerala.

Ponnani script

The Arabi Malayalam script, otherwise known as the Ponnani script, is a writing system – a variant form of the Arabic script with special orthographic features – which was developed during the early medieval period and used to write Arabi Malayalam until the early 20th century CE. Though the script originated and developed in Kerala, today it is predominantly used in Malaysia and Singapore by the migrant Muslim community.

Literature

The Sangam literature can be considered as the ancient predecessor of Malayalam. According to Iravatham Mahadevan, the earliest Malayalam inscription discovered until now is the Edakal-5 inscription (ca. late 4th century – early 5th century) reading  (English: 'this is old'). Although this has been disputed by other scholars. The use of the pronoun  and the lack of the literary Tamil  ending are archaisms from Proto-Dravidian rather than unique innovations of Malayalam.

The early literature of Malayalam comprised three types of composition:
Malayalam Nada, Tamil Nada and Sanskrit Nada.
 Classical songs known as Nadan Pattu
 Manipravalam of the Sanskrit tradition, which permitted a generous interspersing of Sanskrit with Malayalam. Niranam poets Manipravalam Madhava Panikkar, Sankara Panikkar and Rama Panikkar wrote Manipravalam poetry in the 14th century.
 The folk song rich in native elements
Malayalam literature has been profoundly influenced by poets Cherusseri Namboothiri, Thunchaththu Ezhuthachan, and Poonthanam Nambudiri, in the 15th and the 16th centuries of Common Era. Unnayi Variyar, a probable 17th–18th century poet, and Kunchan Nambiar, a poet of 18th century, also greatly influenced Malayalam literature in its early form. The words used in many of the Arabi Malayalam works those date back to 16th–17th centuries of Common Era are also very closer to the modern Malayalam language. The prose literature, criticism, and Malayalam journalism began after the latter half of 18th century CE. Contemporary Malayalam literature deals with social, political, and economic life context. The tendency of the modern poetry is often towards political radicalism. Malayalam literature has been presented with six Jnanapith awards, the second-most for any Dravidian language and the third-highest for any Indian language.

Malayalam poetry to the late 20th century betrays varying degrees of the fusion of the three different strands. The oldest examples of Pattu and Manipravalam, respectively, are Ramacharitam and Vaishikatantram, both from the 12th century.

The earliest extant prose work in the language is a commentary in simple Malayalam, Bhashakautalyam (12th century) on Chanakya's Arthashastra. Adhyatmaramayanam by Thunchaththu Ramanujan Ezhuthachan (known as the father of modern Malayalam literature) who was born in Tirur, one of the most important works in Malayalam literature. Unnunili Sandesam written in the 14th century is amongst the oldest literary works in Malayalam language. Cherusseri Namboothiri of 15th century (Kannur-based poet), Poonthanam Nambudiri of 16th century (Perinthalmanna-based poet), Unnayi Variyar of 17th–18th centuries (Thrissur-based poet), and Kunchan Nambiar of 18th century (Palakkad-based poet), have played a major role in the development of Malayalam literature into current form. The words used in many of the Arabi Malayalam works, which dates back to 16th–17th centuries are also very closer to modern Malayalam language. The basin of the river Bharathappuzha, which is otherwise known as River Ponnani, and its tributaries, have played a major role in the development of modern Malayalam Literature.

By the end of the 18th century some of the Christian missionaries from Kerala started writing in Malayalam but mostly travelogues, dictionaries and religious books. Varthamanappusthakam (1778), written by Paremmakkal Thoma Kathanar is considered to be the first travelogue in an Indian language. The modern Malayalam grammar is based on the book Kerala Panineeyam written by A. R. Raja Raja Varma in late 19th century CE.

Folk Songs
For the first 600 years of the Malayalam calendar, Malayalam literature remained in a preliminary stage. During this time, Malayalam literature consisted mainly of various genres of songs (Pattu). Folk songs are the oldest literary form in Malayalam. They were just oral songs. Many of them were related to agricultural activities, including Pulayar Pattu, Pulluvan Pattu, Njattu Pattu, Koythu Pattu, etc. Other Ballads of Folk Song period include the Vadakkan Pattukal (Northern songs) in North Malabar region and the Thekkan Pattukal (Southern songs) in Southern Travancore. Some of the earliest Mappila songs (Muslim songs) were also folk songs.

Old and Middle Malayalam

The earliest known poems in Malayalam, Ramacharitam and Thirunizhalmala, dated to the 12th to 14th century, were completed before the introduction of the Sanskrit alphabet. It was written by a poet with the pen name Cheeramakavi who, according to poet Ulloor S Parameswara Iyer, was Sree Veerarama Varman, a king of southern Kerala from AD 1195 to 1208. However the claim that it was written in Southern Kerala is expired on the basis of new discoveries. Other experts, like Chirakkal T Balakrishnan Nair, Dr. K.M. George, M. M. Purushothaman Nair, and P.V. Krishnan Nair, state that the origin of the book is in Kasaragod district in North Malabar region. They cite the use of certain words in the book and also the fact that the manuscript of the book was recovered from Nileshwaram in North Malabar. The influence of Ramacharitam is mostly seen in the contemporary literary works of Northern Kerala. The words used in Ramacharitam such as Nade (Mumbe), Innum (Iniyum), Ninna (Ninne), Chaaduka (Eriyuka) are special features of the dialect spoken in North Malabar (Kasaragod-Kannur region). Furthermore, the Thiruvananthapuram mentioned in Ramacharitham is not the Thiruvananthapuram in Southern Kerala. But it is Ananthapura Lake Temple of Kumbla in the northernmost Kasaragod district of Kerala. The word Thiru is used just by the meaning Honoured. Today it is widely accepted that Ramacharitham was written somewhere in North Malabar (most likely near Kasaragod).

But the period of the earliest available literary document cannot be the sole criterion used to determine the antiquity of a language. In its early literature, Malayalam has songs, Pattu, for various subjects and occasions, such as harvesting, love songs, heroes, gods, etc. A form of writing called Campu emerged from the 14th century onwards. It mixed poetry with prose and used a vocabulary strongly influenced by Sanskrit, with themes from epics and Puranas.

The works including Unniyachi Charitham, Unnichirudevi Charitham, and Unniyadi Charitham, are written in Middle Malayalam, those date back to 13th and 14th centuries of Common Era. The Sandesha Kavyas of 14th century CE written in Manipravalam language include Unnuneeli Sandesam The literary works written in Middle Malayalam were heavily influenced by Sanskrit and Prakrit, while comparing them with the modern Malayalam literature. The word Manipravalam literally means Diamond-Coral or Ruby-Coral. The 14th-century Lilatilakam text states Manipravalam to be a Bhashya (language) where "Malayalam and Sanskrit should combine together like ruby and coral, without the least trace of any discord". The Champu Kavyas written by Punam Nambudiri, one among the Pathinettara Kavikal (Eighteen and a half poets) in the court of the Zamorin of Calicut, also belong to Middle Malayalam.

Modern Malayalam
The poem Krishnagatha written by Cherusseri Namboothiri, who was the court poet of the king Udaya Varman Kolathiri (1446–1475) of Kolathunadu, is written in modern Malayalam. The language used in Krishnagatha is the modern spoken form of Malayalam. It appears to be the first literary work written in the present-day language of Malayalam. During the 16th century CE, Thunchaththu Ezhuthachan from the Kingdom of Tanur and Poonthanam Nambudiri from the Kingdom of Valluvanad followed the new trend initiated by Cherussery in their poems. The Adhyathmaramayanam Kilippattu and Mahabharatham Kilippattu written by Ezhuthachan and Jnanappana written by Poonthanam are also included in the earliest form of Modern Malayalam. The words used in most of the Arabi Malayalam works, which dates back to 16th–17th centuries, are also very closer to modern Malayalam language. P. Shangunny Menon ascribes the authorship of the medieval work Keralolpathi, which describes the Parashurama legend and the departure of the final Cheraman Perumal king to Mecca, to Thunchaththu Ramanujan Ezhuthachan.

Kunchan Nambiar, the founder of Thullal movement, was a prolific literary figure of the 18th century.

Impact of European scholars

The British printed Malabar English Dictionary by Graham Shaw in 1779 was still in the form of a Tamil-English Dictionary. Paremmakkal Thoma Kathanar wrote the first Malayalam travelogue called Varthamanappusthakam in 1789.

Hermann Gundert, (1814–1893), a German missionary and scholar of exceptional linguistic talents, played a distinguishable role in the development of Malayalam literature. His major works are Keralolpathi (1843), Pazhancholmala (1845), Malayalabhaasha Vyakaranam (1851), Paathamala (1860) the first Malayalam school text book, Kerala pazhama (1868), the first Malayalam dictionary (1872), Malayalarajyam (1879) – Geography of Kerala, Rajya Samacharam (1847 June) the first Malayalam news paper, Paschimodayam (1879) – Magazine. He lived in Thalassery for around 20 years. He learned the language from well established local teachers Ooracheri Gurukkanmar from Chokli, a village near Thalassery and consulted them in works. He also translated the Bible into Malayalam.

In 1821, the Church Mission Society (CMS) at Kottayam in association with the Syriac Orthodox Church started a seminary at Kottayam in 1819 and started printing books in Malayalam when Benjamin Bailey, an Anglican priest, made the first Malayalam types. In addition, he contributed to standardizing the prose. Hermann Gundert from Stuttgart, Germany, started the first Malayalam newspaper, Rajya Samacaram in 1847 at Talasseri. It was printed at Basel Mission. Malayalam and Sanskrit were increasingly studied by Christians of Kottayam and Pathanamthitta. The Marthomite movement in the mid-19th century called for replacement of Syriac by Malayalam for liturgical purposes. By the end of the 19th century Malayalam replaced Syriac as language of Liturgy in all Syrian Christian churches.

1850–1904

Vengayil Kunhiraman Nayanar, (1861–1914) from Thalassery was the author of first Malayalam short story, Vasanavikriti. After him innumerable world class literature works by was born in Malayalam.

O. Chandu Menon wrote his novels "Indulekha" and "Saradha" while he was the judge at Parappanangadi Munciff Court. Indulekha is also the first Major Novel written in Malayalam language.

.

The third quarter of the 19th century CE bore witness to the rise of a new school of poets devoted to the observation of life around them and the use of pure Malayalam. The major poets of the Venmani School were Venmani Achhan Nambudiripad (1817–1891), Venmani Mahan Nambudiripad (1844–1893), Poonthottam Achhan Nambudiri (1821–1865), Poonthottam Mahan Nambudiri (1857–1896) and the members of the Kodungallur Kovilakam (Royal Family) such as Kodungallur Kunjikkuttan Thampuran. The style of these poets became quite popular for a while and influenced even others who were not members of the group like Velutheri Kesavan Vaidyar (1839–1897) and Perunlli Krishnan Vaidyan (1863–1894). The Venmani school pioneered a style of poetry that was associated with common day themes, and the use of pure Malayalam (Pachcha Malayalam) rather than Sanskrit.

Twentieth century
In the second half of the 20th century, Jnanpith winning poets and writers like G. Sankara Kurup, S. K. Pottekkatt, Thakazhi Sivasankara Pillai,  M. T. Vasudevan Nair, O. N. V. Kurup, Edasseri Govindan Nair and Akkitham Achuthan Namboothiri, had made valuable contributions to the modern Malayalam literature. Later, writers like O. V. Vijayan, Kamaladas, M. Mukundan, Arundhati Roy, and Vaikom Muhammed Basheer, have gained international recognition.

Prose
The travelogues written by S. K. Pottekkatt were turning point in the travelogue literature. The writers like Kavalam Narayana Panicker have contributed much to Malayalam drama.

Thakazhi Sivasankara Pillai turned away from party politics and produced a moving romance in Chemmeen (Shrimps) in 1956. For S. K. Pottekkatt and Vaikom Muhammad Basheer, who had not dabbled in politics, the continuity is marked in the former's Vishakanyaka (Poison Maid, 1948) and the latter's Ntuppuppakkoranendarnnu (My Grandpa had an Elephant, 1951). The non-political social or domestic novel was championed by P. C. Kuttikrishnan (Uroob) with his Ummachu (1955) and Sundarikalum Sundaranmarum (Men and Women of Charm, 1958).

In 1957 Basheer's Pathummayude Aadu (Pathumma's Goat) brought in a new kind of prose tale, which perhaps only Basheer could handle with dexterity. The fifties thus mark the evolution of a new kind of fiction, which had its impact on the short stories as well. This was the auspicious moment for the entry of M. T. Vasudevan Nair and T. Padmanabhan upon the scene. Front runners in the post-modern trend include Kakkanadan, O. V. Vijayan, E. Harikumar, M. Mukundan and Anand.

Kerala has the highest media exposure in India with newspapers publishing in nine languages, mainly English and Malayalam.

Poetry
Contemporary Malayalam poetry deals with social, political, and economic life context. The tendency of the modern poetry is often towards political radicalism.

See also

 Arabi Malayalam
 Beary bashe
 Jeseri
 Judeo-Malayalam

 Malayalam (Unicode block)
 Malayalam Braille
 Malayalam calendar
 Malayalam cinema
 Malayalam languages
 Malayalam literature
 Malayalam poetry
 Malayali
 Manipravalam
 Palindrome
 Ravula language
 Suriyani Malayalam
 Tigalari script

References

Sources
 
 
 
 
 Govindankutty, A. "From Proto-Tamil-Malayalam to West Coast Dialects," 1972. Indo-Iranian Journal, Vol. XIV, Nr. 1/2, pp. 52–60.

Further reading 

 English
 
 
 
 
 
 
 
 
 
 
 
 
 
 
 
 
 
 
 
 

 Malayalam

Notes

External links
 
 Malayalam language at Encyclopædia Britannica
 Unicode Code Chart for Malayalam (PDF Format)

Ancient languages
Christian liturgical languages
Classical Language in India
Languages attested from the 9th century
Languages with own distinct writing systems
Languages officially written in Indic scripts

Official languages of India
Subject–object–verb languages
Sahitya Akademi recognised languages